Califorctenus is a genus of spiders in the family Ctenidae. It was first described in 2017 by Jiménez, Berrian, Polotow, and Palacios-Cardiel. , it contains only one species, Califorctenus cacachilensis, also known as the Sierra Cacachilas wandering spider.

Califorctenus cacachilensis
Califorctenus cacachilensis is named for the Sierra de las Cacachilas mountain range in Baja California Sur, where it was first found in an abandoned mine by Michael Wall and Jim Berrian, researchers from the San Diego Natural History Museum, during an expedition on November 4, 2013.

Subsequent collaboration with María Jimenez, an entomologist from Mexico who identified it as a member of the Ctenidae or wandering spider family, confirmed it was a new species and genus. Berrian initially noted shed exoskeletons during the 2013 expedition, and eventually found two dozen spiders, bringing eight back to San Diego for further study. He received a spider bite during the expedition, which he described as "like being poked by a cactus spine and a little mild pain."

References

External links
 
 
 

Ctenidae
Monotypic Araneomorphae genera
Spiders of Mexico